The English place-name Chester, and the suffixes -chester, -caster and -cester (old -ceaster), are commonly indications that the place is the site of a Roman castrum, meaning a military camp or fort (cf. Welsh caer), but it can also apply to the site of a pre-historic fort. Names ending in -cester are nearly always reduced to -ster when spoken, the exception being "Cirencester", which is pronounced in full. The pronunciation of names ending in -chester or -caster is regular.

A 
 Acaster Malbis
 Acaster Selby
 Alcester
 Alchester
 Ancaster

B 
 Bicester
 Binchester
 Brancaster

C 
 Caister-on-Sea
 Caistor
 Caistor St Edmund
 Casterton, Cumbria
 Casterton, Great, Rutland
 Casterton, Little, Rutland
 Castor, Cambridgeshire
 Chester
 Cheshire, Chester-shire
 Chester, Little, Derby
 Chesterfield
 Chesterford, Great
 Chesterford, Little
 Chester-le-Street
 Chesterton (disambiguation)
 Chesterwood
 Chichester
 Cirencester
 Colchester

D 
 Doncaster
 Dorchester
 Dorset, Dor-chester-seat
 Dorchester-on-Thames, Oxfordshire

E 
 Ebchester
 Exeter

F 
 Frocester

G 
Gloucester
Godmanchester
Grantchester

H 
Hincaster

I 
 Ilchester
 Irchester

K 
 Kenchester

L 
 Lancaster
 Lancashire, Lune-caster-shire
 Lanchester
 Leicester

M 
 Mancetter
 Manchester
 Muncaster

P 
 Portchester

R 
 Ribchester
 Rocester
 Rochester, Kent
 Rochester, Northumberland

S 
 Silchester

T 
 Tadcaster
 Towcester

U 
 Uttoxeter

W 
 Winchester
 Woodchester
 Worcester
 Wroxeter

Notes

Place name element etymologies
English toponymy
English suffixes